Emilianów may refer to the following places:
Emilianów, Łowicz County in Łódź Voivodeship (central Poland)
Emilianów, Sieradz County in Łódź Voivodeship (central Poland)
Emilianów, Tomaszów Mazowiecki County in Łódź Voivodeship (central Poland)
Emilianów, Lublin Voivodeship (east Poland)
Emilianów, Gostynin County in Masovian Voivodeship (east-central Poland)
Emilianów, Sochaczew County in Masovian Voivodeship (east-central Poland)
Emilianów, Sokołów County in Masovian Voivodeship (east-central Poland)
Emilianów, Wołomin County in Masovian Voivodeship (east-central Poland)
Emilianów, Żyrardów County in Masovian Voivodeship (east-central Poland)
Emilianów, Greater Poland Voivodeship (west-central Poland)